Karl-Marx-Allee is a monumental socialist boulevard built by the GDR between 1952 and 1960 in Berlin Friedrichshain and Mitte. Today the boulevard is named after Karl Marx. It should not be confused with the Karl-Marx-Straße in the Neukölln district of Berlin.

The boulevard was named Stalinallee between 1949 and 1961 (previously Große Frankfurter Straße), and was a flagship building project of East Germany's reconstruction programme after World War II. It was designed by the architects Hermann Henselmann, Hartmann, Hopp, Leucht, Paulick, and Souradny to contain spacious and luxurious apartments for workers, as well as shops, restaurants, cafés, a tourist hotel, and an enormous cinema, the Kino International.

At each end are dual towers at Frankfurter Tor and Strausberger Platz designed by Hermann Henselmann. The buildings differ in the revetments of the facades which contain often equally, traditional Berlin motifs by Karl Friedrich Schinkel. Most of the buildings are covered by architectural ceramics.  

By 1989 half the tiles on the outer facades of these buildings had fallen off, necessitating sheltering structures over the sidewalks in some places to protect pedestrians. 

A monumental Stalin statue presented to the East German government by a Komsomol delegation on the occasion of the Third World Festival of Youth and Students  was formally dedicated on 3 August 1951 after being temporarily placed at a location on the newly designed and impressive boulevard. It remained there until 1961 when it was removed in a clandestine operation in the course of de-Stalinization.

On 17 June 1953 the Stalinallee became the focus of a worker uprising which endangered the young state's existence. Builders and construction workers demonstrated against the communist government, leading to a national uprising. The rebellion was crushed with Soviet tanks and troops, resulting in the deaths of 125 people. 

Later the street was used for East Germany's annual May Day parade, featuring thousands of soldiers along with tanks and other military vehicles to showcase the power and the glory of the communist government.

De-Stalinization led to the renaming of the street, after the founder of Marxism, in late 1961. Since the collapse of Eastern European communism in 1989/1990, renaming the street back to its prewar name Große Frankfurter Straße has periodically been discussed, so far without conclusive results.

The boulevard later found favour with postmodernists, with Philip Johnson describing it as 'true city planning on the grand scale', while Aldo Rossi called it 'Europe's last great street.' Since German reunification most of the buildings, including the two towers, have been restored.

Shopping
After its completion in the 1950s, the boulevard was very popular with Berliners and visitors alike. People crowded into the stores. "Taking the E line to the shops on Stalin Boulevard" was not only a catchy slogan, it was also characteristic of everyday life in the East German capital. People could find things they would not see elsewhere, and the shopping facilities set an example for the whole of the GDR. The shops offered great variety and were attractively decorated. People could relax in cafés such as Sybylle or at the  cinema, and in the evening they could take their guests to one of the representative restaurants with such sonorous names as Warschau (Warsaw), Bukarest (Bucharest) (notable for its 18% alcohol Romanian beer), or Budapest.

The boulevard soon developed into a shoppers' paradise in the GDR. It also served the ideological function of introducing visitors to the culture of its "socialist sister states". Shopping was a mixed experience for visitors from the West. Most stores would not accept payment for purchased items without a receipt from an East German bank showing that the West German Marks had been exchanged for East German Marks at a rate of 1:1. In the West, the exchange rate was 1:8 but most restaurants and bookstores were not concerned with these requirements so bargains were to be found.

"Stalin's bathroom"
In February 2009, an anonymous author edited the article "Karl-Marx-Allee" in the German-language edition of Wikipedia, claiming that during the time of the GDR the road had acquired the nickname "Stalin's bathroom" due to the buildings' tiled façades. Subsequently, several media outlets reiterated this claim. No alternative verification for the term was given, making it a self-referential claim.

After a letter written to the Berliner Zeitung questioned whether the term "Stalin's bathroom" had actually been in common use during the GDR period, Andreas Kopietz, a journalist at the newspaper, published an article admitting he had invented the phrase and identifying himself as the original anonymous Wikipedia editor, allowing the record to be set straight.

In popular media 
The boulevard is referenced under its former name, the Stalinallee, in the satirical poem "Die Lösung" by Bertolt Brecht about the East German uprising of 1953.

Photographs

See also
 Stalinist architecture
 Seven Sisters (Moscow)
 The Straße der Pariser Kommune (street of the Paris Commune) connects with Karl-Marx-Allee

References

External links

 A photo tour of Karl-Marx-Allee

Streets in Berlin
Boulevards
Karl Marx
Buildings and structures in Mitte
Buildings and structures in Friedrichshain-Kreuzberg
Stalinist architecture
Buildings and structures of East Berlin